"The Adventures of Phoebe Zeit-Geist" was an American comics series, written by Michael O'Donoghue and drawn by Frank Springer. From January 1965, it was serialized in the magazine Evergreen Review, and later published in book form as a Grove Press hardcover in 1968 and trade paperback in 1969. It was reissued as a trade paperback in 1986 (Ken Pierce Books).

Plot
The comic detailed the adventures of debutante Phoebe Zeit-Geist as she was variously kidnapped and rescued by a series of bizarre characters, such as Nazis, Chinese foot fetishists, and lesbian assassins.

Impact

Doonesbury comic-strip creator Garry Trudeau cited the strip as an early inspiration, saying, "[A] very heavy influence was a serial in the Sixties called 'Phoebe Zeitgeist' ... It was an absolutely brilliant, deadpan send-up of adventure comics, but with a very edgy modernist kind of approach. To this day, I hold virtually every panel in my brain. It's very hard not to steal from it."

References

American comic strips
Adult comic strips
Erotic comics
Satirical comics
1965 comics debuts
1968 comics endings
American comics characters
Science fiction comics
Comics about women
Works originally published in American magazines
Works originally published in literary magazines
Works by Michael O'Donoghue
Works originally published in Evergreen Review
Debutantes